The Country Bear Vacation Hoedown is a summer overlay for the Disney theme parks attraction Country Bear Jamboree. In Disneyland, it opened in February 1986 replacing the original show. That May, the Walt Disney World version followed suit. It remained at Walt Disney World until February 1992 when the original show returned. At Disneyland however, the Hoedown remained until the Country Bear Playhouse closed on September 9, 2001.

On July 15, 1994, the show opened at Tokyo Disneyland as Vacation Jamboree. Out of the three shows, it features the most differences between the US and Japanese versions. Several of the songs are different, and there is more dialog from Henry.

At Disneyland, the attraction was replaced by The Many Adventures of Winnie the Pooh, which opened in April 2003.

Characters
Because the show was a Vacation Hoedown, the characters in the show were put into vacation outfits for their various acts.

Note: This page describes only the special vacation costumes of the characters. For information on how the characters appear in their normal show and the many voice actors that bring them to life, please consult the Country Bear Jamboree page.

The Bears
Henry - The Master of Ceremonies of the show, Henry is a welcoming and friendly brown bear. He wears his old "Camp Grizzly" T-shirt (which barely fits him) and a scout master's hat. In some parts of the show, he plays a yellow guitar. He is voiced by Pete Renaday.

Liver Lips McGrowl - Liver Lips is perhaps the funniest-looking bear. He is a brown bear who gets his name from his very large lips. He becomes an Elvis impersonator in this show, appearing as a mountain climber wearing an Elvis-style shirt with a blue lederhosen. He plays a Fender Stratocaster guitar with a strap and a portable amplifier. He is voiced by Dave Durham.

Wendell - Wendell is brown bear with a massive overbite and buck teeth. He wears a vacation shirt and hat and carries a camera, which he takes a couple of flash pictures with. He is voiced by Dave Durham.

Teddi Berra - Teddi Berra never appears onstage. Instead, she descends from a hole in the ceiling on her swing. She is a brown bear who wears a yellow raincoat and galoshes and holds an umbrella. She is voiced by Genia Fuller.

Ernest - Ernest is a brown bear who plays the fiddle. He wears his old derby from the original show and a stripped shirt. He uses a fly swatter as a bow for his fiddle. He is voiced by Mike Weston.

Terrence (aka Shaker) - Terrence is a tall bear with tan fur who plays a guitar. In this show, he wears a blue scuba mask and snorkel and blue trunks. Seaweed is around him. He is also accompanied by his octopus "girlfriend," Delores. He is voiced by Harry Middlebrooks. The Delores animatronic can be found today in the guest loading room of Guardians of the Galaxy – Mission: Breakout!, which opened in 2017 at Disney California Adventure.

Trixie - Trixie is a very large brown bear who holds a napkin in one hand and a sandwich in the other. She wears a pink skirt with butterflies on it and a hat. She is voiced by Suzanne Sherwin.

Big Al - Big Al is the fattest bear. He is a grey with a light grey belly and plays a guitar with his name on it. He wears a plaid flannel shirt with a miner's hat and camping gear. His voice is provided by Peter Klimes.

The Sun Bonnet Trio
 Bunny - Bunny stands in the center of the stage. Because she and her sisters are triplets, they all have brown fur. She wears a two-piece sailor-inspired swimsuit. She is voiced by Dianne Michelle. 
 Bubbles - Bubbles stands to the audience's left, between Gomer and Bunny. She wears a one-piece, white swimsuit covered in red hearts, a red towel and heart-shaped sunglasses. She is voiced by Lori Johnson. 
 Beulah - Beulah stands to the audience's right. She wears a pink floral bikini. She is voiced by Holaday Mason.

Gomer - Gomer never sings, but instead plays his piano, which has a clam and a pineapple on top of it and fishing net thrown over it. He is considered as Henry's right-hand bear. He is tall, brown and wears a pink Hawaiian shirt, a lei and a straw hat.

The Five Bear Rugs
 Zeke - Considered the leader of The Five Bear Rugs, Zeke plays a banjo and taps on a dishpan with "a real ol' country beat". He is a gray bear with glasses who wears a fishing vest and hat. He is voiced by Harry Middlebrooks.
 Zeb - Zeb is a brown bear with a light brown stomach who plays the fiddle. He wears a fishing hat, brown boots and a white T-shirt with Binoculars. He is voiced by Curt Wilson (speaking) and Rod Burton (singing).
 Ted - Ted is a tall, skinny brown bear who blows on the corn jug and plays the washboard. Unlike the other four Bear Rugs, he does not wear any clothes in this show, wearing only a raccoon hat and camping gear.
 Fred - The biggest of The Five Bear Rugs, he plays the smallest instrument: the mouth harp. He has brown fur and wears a green bandanna, a raccoon hat, blue jeans with suspenders and camping gear.
 Tennessee - Tennessee Bear plays "The Thing" (an upright bass with only one string and a tiny bird sitting on it). He has brown fur and wears a fishing hat and a Hawaiian vest. His deep voice is provided by Lee Dresser.

Baby Oscar - Oscar is a brown bear who appears with The Five Bear Rugs, but plays no instrument. He wears a Boy Scout uniform and always has his teddy bear to keep him company.

Rufus - Rufus is never seen, but only heard in the projection booth as he runs here and there to fix light bulbs, change projections, alter backdrops, etc. He can be heard from time to time running backstage, constantly out of breath.

Other Animals
Buff - Buff is the largest. He is the head portion of an American bison. In this show, he wears a fisherman's hat and is voiced by Disney legend Thurl Ravenscroft.

Max - Max is the head portion of a whitetail buck. In the show, he wears a green baseball cap. He is voiced by Mike West.

Melvin - Melvin is the bull moose head of the animal head trio. He often makes good-natured jokes. In the show, he has a variety of hats, most of which are hanging on his antlers as if they were hat racks. He is voiced by Frank Welker.

Randy - Randy, a skunk who loves to sing and tap dance, appears in this version of the show in place of Sammy the Raccoon. He keeps breaking into the backstage area. At various times throughout the show, the bears can be heard offstage running here and there, trying to get away from him. In the finale, he manages to get onto the top of Henry's hat and finally reveals that he only wanted to break into show business with the bears. He is voiced by Frank Welker.

The Show
This special variation of the classic show features the Country Bears celebrating the many joys of summer and the great outdoors. Its opening is different from the other shows because Max, Buff, and Melvin do not talk at the beginning Instead, the five Bear Rugs can be heard tuning up their instruments. Zeke calls for Rufus to turn on the lights, and then the show begins with "The Great Outdoors". In the Japanese version however, instead of hearing the five Bear Rugs tune up, Max, Buff and Melvin continue the trend of having the first bit of dialogue (although it's in Japanese)

The Songs
Disneyland/Disney World Versions:
 "The Great Outdoors" - The 5 Bear Rugs and Henry
 "Life's No Picnic Without You" - Trixie
 "On the Road Again" - Wendell
 "We Can Make It To the Top" - Liver Lips McGrowl
 "California Bears" - The Sun Bonnets, Gomer, Max, Buff, and Melvin
 "Two Different Worlds" - Terrence the Shaker (with Dolores the octopus)
 "Rocky Top" - The 5 Bear Rugs
 "Nature" - Ernest the Dude
 "Singin' In the Rain" - Teddi Barra and Henry
 "Ghost Riders In the Sky" - The 5 Bear Rugs
 "On My Way To Your Heart" - Big Al
 "Thank God I'm a Country Bear" - Cast

Tokyo Disneyland Version:
 "The Great Outdoors" - The 5 Bear Rugs and Henry (sung in Japanese)
 "On the Road Again" - Wendell (sung in Japanese)
 "Achy Breaky Heart" - Trixie (Verses 1 &3 in Japanese and verse 2 in English)
 "Over My Head Over You" - Terrence (with Dolores the octopus)(sung in Japanese) Note: This song was originally going to be used in the US version, before "Two Different Worlds" was decided upon. 
 "California Bears" - The Sun Bonnets, Gomer, Max, Buff, and Melvin (sung in English but abbreviated from the U.S. version)
 "We Can Make It To the Top" - Liver Lips McGrowl and The Sun Bonnets (sung in English)
 "Singin' In the Rain" - Teddi Barra and Henry (sung in English)
 "Mountain Music" - Ernest the Dude, Henry and The 5 Bear Rugs (sung in Japanese)
 "I've Been Working on the Railroad" - Big Al (sung in Japanese)
 "Camptown Races / She'll Be Coming 'Round the Mountain / Vacation" - Cast (sung in Japanese)

References

Former Walt Disney Parks and Resorts attractions
Amusement park attractions introduced in 1986
Amusement park attractions that closed in 1992
Amusement park attractions introduced in 1992
Amusement park attractions that closed in 2001
Amusement park attractions introduced in 1994
Audio-Animatronic attractions
Disneyland
Magic Kingdom
Tokyo Disneyland